All Saints' Church, Stanton Hill is a parish church in the Church of England in Stanton Hill, Nottinghamshire.

The church is not a listed building, however, Stanton Hill War Memorial, in front of the Church is Grade II listed by the Department for Digital, Culture, Media and Sport as it is of special architectural or historic interest.

History
The church dates from 1899 and the foundation stone was laid by the Countess of Carnaervon.

Parish structure
It is a daughter church to St. Andrew's Church, Skegby.

Gallery

Sources

Church of England church buildings in Nottinghamshire